Hemiconus peraratus is an extinct species of sea snail, a marine gastropod mollusk, in the family Conidae, the cone snails and their allies.

The variety Hemiconus peraratus var. gouetensis Cossmann, 1897 † accepted as Hemiconus gouetensis Cossmann, 1897 † (original rank)

Distribution
Fossils of this marine species were found in France.

References

 Cossmann, M. "Mollusques éocèniques de la Loire-inférieure. Tome 1, fasc. 2." Bulletin de la Société des Sciences naturelles de l’Ouest de la France 6.4 (1897): 180–246.
 Tracey S., Craig B., Belliard L. & Gain O. (2017). One, four or forty species? - early Conidae (Mollusca, Gastropoda) that led to a radiation and biodiversity peak in the late Lutetian Eocene of the Cotentin, NW France. Carnets de Voyages Paléontologiques dans le Bassin Anglo-Parisien. 3: 1-38.

peraratus
Gastropods described in 1897